Kr00k (also written as KrØØk) is a security vulnerability that allows some WPA2 encrypted WiFi traffic to be decrypted. The vulnerability was originally discovered by security company ESET in 2019 and assigned  on August 17, 2019. ESET estimates that this vulnerability affects over a billion devices.

Discovery 
It was named Kr00k by Robert Lipovsky and Stefan Svorencik. It was discovered when trying variations of the KRACK attack.

Initially found in chips made by Broadcom and Cypress, similar vulnerabilities have been found in other implementations, including those by Qualcomm and MediaTek.

Patches 
The vulnerability is known to be patched in:

 iOS 13.2 and iPadOS 13.2 - October 28, 2019 
 macOS Catalina 10.15.1, Security Update 2019-001, and Security Update 2019-006 - October 29, 2019

Vulnerable devices 
During their research, ESET confirmed over a dozen popular devices were vulnerable.

Cisco has found several of their devices to be vulnerable and are working on patches. They are tracking the issue with advisory id cisco-sa-20200226-wi-fi-info-disclosure.

Known vulnerable devices include:

 Amazon Echo 2nd gen
 Amazon Kindle 8th gen
 Apple iPad mini 2
 Apple iPhone 6, 6S, 8, XR
 Apple MacBook Air Retina 13-inch 2018
 Asus wireless routers (RT-AC1200G+, RT-AC68U), but fixed in firmware Version 3.0.0.4.382.5161220 during March 2020
 Google Nexus 5
 Google Nexus 6
 Google Nexus 6P
 Raspberry Pi 3
 Samsung Galaxy S4 (GT-I9505)
 Samsung Galaxy S8
 Xiaomi Redmi 3S

References 

Computer security exploits
Hardware bugs
Wi-Fi
Computer-related introductions in 2019
Telecommunications-related introductions in 2019